The 1982 U.S. Clay Court Championships was a men's Grand Prix and women's Toyota Series tennis tournament held in Indianapolis in the United States and played on outdoor clay courts. It was the 14th edition of the tournament and was held from August 2 through August 8, 1982. Fifth-seeded José Higueras and top-seeded Virginia Ruzici won the singles titles.

Finals

Men's singles

 José Higueras defeated  Jimmy Arias 7–5, 5–7, 6–3
 It was Higueras' 2nd title of the year and the 11th of his career.

Women's singles

 Virginia Ruzici defeated  Helena Suková 6–2, 6–0
 It was Ruzici's 3rd title of the year and the 10th of her career.

Men's doubles

 Sherwood Stewart /  Ferdi Taygan defeated  Robbie Venter /  Blaine Willenborg 6–4, 7–5

Women's doubles

 Ivanna Madruga-Osses /  Catherine Tanvier defeated  JoAnne Russell /  Virginia Ruzici 7–5, 7–6(7-4)

References

External links 

 
U.S. Men's Clay Court Championships
U.S. Clay Court Championships
U.S. Clay Court Championships
U.S. Clay Court Championships